The Eurasian wigeon or European wigeon (Mareca penelope), also known as the widgeon or the wigeon, is one of three species of wigeon in the dabbling duck genus Mareca. It is common and widespread within its Palearctic range.

Taxonomy
The Eurasian wigeon was described by Carl Linnaeus in his landmark 1758 10th edition of Systema Naturae under the binomial name Anas penelope. Anas is the Latin word for "duck", and penelope refers to a duck that was supposed to have rescued Penelope when she was thrown into the sea. Her name derives from Ancient Greek πήνη pene, "braid" and ὤψ ops "appearance", from the ruse she used to deter suitors while her husband Ulysses was absent.

Description
The breeding male has grey flanks and back, with a black rear end, a dark green speculum and a brilliant white patch on upper wings, obvious in flight or at rest. It has a pink breast, white belly, and a chestnut head with a creamy crown. In non-breeding (eclipse) plumage, the drake looks more like the female. The female is light brown, with plumage much like a female American wigeon. It can be distinguished from most other ducks, apart from American wigeon, on shape. However, that species has a paler head and white axillaries on its underwing. The female can be a rufous morph with a redder head, and a gray morph with a more gray head.

Distribution

It breeds in the northernmost areas of Europe and the Palearctic. It is the Old World counterpart of North America's American wigeon. It is strongly migratory and winters further south than its breeding range. It migrates to southern Asia and Africa. In Great Britain and Ireland, the Eurasian wigeon is common as a winter visitor, but scarce as a breeding bird in Scotland, the Lake District, the Pennines and occasionally further south, with only a handful of breeding pairs in Ireland. It can be found as an uncommon winter visitor in the United States on the mid-Atlantic and Pacific coasts. It is a rare visitor to the rest of the United States except for the Four Corners and the southern Appalachians.

Behaviour and habitat

The Eurasian wigeon is a bird of open wetlands, such as wet grassland or marshes with some taller vegetation, and usually feeds by dabbling for plant food or grazing, which it does very readily. It nests on the ground, near water and under cover. It is highly gregarious outside of the breeding season and will form large flocks. They will join with flocks of the American wigeon in the United States, and they also hybridize with them. This is a noisy species. The male has a clear whistle that sounds like: "pjiew pjiew", whereas the female has a low growl: "rawr".

The Eurasian wigeon is one of the species to which the Agreement on the Conservation of African-Eurasian Migratory Waterbirds (AEWA) applies. Its conservation status is least concern.

Footnotes

References

Identification

Gallery

External links

 Wigeon at RSPB's Birds by Name
 
 
 Feathers of Eurasian wigeon (Anas penelope) 
 
 
 

Eurasian wigeon
Birds of Eurasia
Eurasian wigeon
Eurasian wigeon
Wigeons